Julie Mathilde Lippmann (1864 - 1952)  was a writer, literary critic, women's suffrage supporter, and political writer. She wrote novels, plays, poetry, literary criticism, and U.S. propaganda during World War I. Her novel Martha By-The-Day was adapted on stage in 1914. The 1919 film  The Hoodlum (1919 film) was based on her novel Burkeses Amy.

Lippmann was born in Brooklyn, New York. She was educated at private schools in Brooklyn and by a governess. She traveled extensively.

She was friends with Louisa May Alcott, Charles Dudley Warner, William Gillette, and Mark Twain.

Her stories were published in various magazines. She wrote the lyrics to the song "My Lady Jacqueminot". Lippmann's poems included "If We But Knew" published in 1889 and "Love and Life".

After her death in 1952, her niece, artist and poet Julie Morrow DeForest, wrote the memoir "Auntie: Remininiscences of Julie M. Lippman".

Bibliography
Dearie, Dot and the Dog (1903), illustrated by Margaret F. Winner
Sweet P's (1905)
Martha by-the-day (1912), her most well known work, she adapted it into a successful play
Making Over Martha (1913)
Burkeses Amy (1914)
Martha and Cupid (1914)
Amy and the Burkeses (1915)
Everyday Girls
The Interlopers (1917)
The Mannequin (1917)
Flexible Ferdinand (1919)
Wildfire
Dorothy Day
Jack o' Dreams

Plays
Cousin Faithful (1908)
The Facts in the Case (1912)
A Fool and His Money (1913)Martha By-the-Day (1914)

FilmographyThe Hoodlum (1919 film)''

References

External links

1864 births
1952 deaths
20th-century American novelists
Poets from New York (state)
Writers from Brooklyn
20th-century American women writers
American women novelists
American women poets
Novelists from New York (state)
20th-century American poets
American literary critics
Women literary critics
American women dramatists and playwrights
20th-century American dramatists and playwrights
American women critics